The "Searchlight Rag" is a ragtime composition by Scott Joplin, first published in 1907. It was named after the town of Searchlight, Nevada, where his friends had gone prospecting, inspiring the title.

History
In 1907, the "Searchlight Rag" by Scott Joplin was published.  In the early 1890s, Joplin's friends, the brothers Tom and Charles Turpin, had done prospecting in the Searchlight, Nevada area.  The brothers' frequent stories of this experience, recounted to the patrons of their bar, inspired the title of the rag.

Musical structure
Intro A A B B A C C D D

Publication history
The copyright was registered August 12, 1907 to Joseph W. Stern and Company of New York.

Like most Joplin compositions, "Searchlight Rag" was still under copyright during the ragtime revival of the 1970s, and the holder of copyrights for this piece, "Fig Leaf Rag" and "Rose Leaf Rag" withheld permission for their inclusion in the definitive New York Public Library edition of Joplin's works and other collections.

In popular culture
The "Searchlight Rag" was used as "Ragtime Style" music in RollerCoaster Tycoon's Added Attractions and Loopy Landscapes expansion pack and the game Roller Coaster Tycoon 2.

See also 
 List of compositions by Scott Joplin

References

External links 
 Sheet music and midi from Mutopia
 Youtube video of "Searchlight Rag" being played

Compositions for solo piano
1907 compositions
Rags by Scott Joplin